Lisandru Tramoni (born 18 April 2003) is a French professional footballer who plays as a forward for Italian  club Pisa.

Club career
Tramoni made his professional debut for AC Ajaccio in a 2–1 Ligue 2 loss to Troyes on 21 December 2019, at the age of 16.

He successively signed with Cagliari, with whom he played only at youth level.

On 18 August 2022, Tramoni moved to Pisa, signing a four-year contract with the Tuscan club.

Personal life
Tramoni is the younger brother of the footballer Mattéo Tramoni.

References

External links
 
 
 

2003 births
Living people
Sportspeople from Ajaccio
Association football forwards
French footballers
France youth international footballers
AC Ajaccio players
Pisa S.C. players
Ligue 2 players
Footballers from Corsica